Enterprise content integration (ECI) is a marketing buzzword for middleware software technology, often used within large organizations, that connects together various types of computer systems that manage documents and digital content. 

ECI systems often work in tandem with other technologies such as enterprise content management, document management, groupware, and records management. 

It takes a decentralized approach in order to manage content from various resources. ECI implementations exist on a tier above the organization's existing software and provide wide-ranging search, indexing, and access functions.

Functions
ECI systems, in particular, and Unified Information Access systems in general, attempt to address the growing trend of the recognition that so-called “unstructured content,” such as a series of documents, can be important and can contribute to business development. Their other important function lies in their ability to increase the efficiency with which organizations can retrieve data by providing a single channel to access a wide variety of storage locations.

Enterprise content integration aims to answer a number of needs in today's organizations:
 Migrating content (documents and images) from one system to another
 Synchronizing part or all the content between two or more content repositories
 Searching for documents across all content repositories
 Offering a single point of access to all documents and content of the organization
 Publishing or pushing this content to other systems (enterprise portals, web sites)

Features
ECI functions through the use of a metadata catalog that contains records regarding data throughout the enterprise in order to enable users to seek, browse, locate, and retrieve the necessary information. ECI metadata catalogs are able to collect data from a wide array of sources, including digital asset management systems, file and web servers, and individual users’ PCs. Vendors sometimes refer to this sort of decentralized content management as a virtual repository or a virtual file system.

In addition to gathering data for the metadata catalog, some ECI systems are able to connect to the resources offered by a computer system directly through an interface such as an API. These types of connections are often referred to as adapters, connectors, or content bridges by ECI vendors.

ECI systems can also offer automated aggregation, packaging, and distribution of indexed content through administrator-configurable channels, which allows flexible reporting and powerful analytic capabilities across a wide array of data sources. ECI administrators can design the system by specifying rules for the way indexed content should be packaged as well as how and to whom the content should be delivered. To accomplish these goals, some ECI systems are able to integrate with other computer systems such as publishing systems and format converters, often through web service interfaces.

Vendors
A number of vendors have provided ECI solutions throughout the history of the technology. One of the first was Context Media (now owned by Oracle); their Interchange Platform (now known as Interchange Suite 3.0) provided several cutting-edge features, including a dashboard interface for monitoring the flow of content and the creation of metadata, a component that allowed the definition of relationships among collected data, and a packaging and distribution function.

Venetica Corporation, founded in 1993, also pioneered ECI solutions with its flagship VeniceBridge product. Venetica was acquired in 2004 by IBM and its ECI technology is now sold as IBM Content Integrator, which provides out-of-the-box connectors for the industry's most popular content management systems, as well as several features for federation and developer services.

Agari Mediaware was another company among those in the first wave of ECI solution providers. However, the company filed for bankruptcy in July 2003. This was likely due to the poor market reception of the product; it was viewed by many implementers as an architecture rather than a complete solution, and most companies desired a solution that could be quickly put into place and enabled with a minimum of additional effort.

Other vendors of ECI systems include Day Software, EntropySoft, and SeeUnity, all of which offer a variety of connectors to various content management systems. A number of search-based applications vendors sell ECI systems, such as Aspire (Search Technologies), CloudView (Exalead), Lookeen Server, and Documentum.

Footnotes

References

Bergman, M.K. Untapped Assets: The $3 Trillion Value of U.S. Enterprise Documents. BrightPlanet Corporation White Paper, July 2005.
Brette, M., Chidlovskii, B., and Roustant, B. Documentum ECI self-repairing wrappers: Performance analysis. SIGMOD ’06: Proceedings of the 2006 ACM SIGMOD International Conference on Management of Data, pp. 708–717, New York, NY. ACM, 2006.
Rosenblatt, B. Enterprise content integration: a progress report. Seybold Report: Analyzing Publishing Technologies, 2003.

Content management systems